Edern may refer to Saint Edern or to:
Edern, Carinthia, Austria
Edern, Finistère, France
Edern, Gwynedd, Wales

See also
Edern ap Nudd, Arthurian knight and also called "St Edern"

name : Jean-Edern Hallier